Imperatrix (foaled 1779) was a British Thoroughbred racehorse. She raced only twice, with her only win coming in the 1782 St. Leger Stakes. She was bred and owned by John Pratt. As a broodmare, Imperatrix produced nine foals.

Background
Imperatrix was a chestnut mare bred by John Pratt and foaled in 1779. She was sired by Alfred, who was a son of Matchem. Alfred won several races at Newmarket, including the Clermont Cup and Grosvenor Stakes. Imperatrix's dam was an unnamed daughter of the stallion Old England.

Racing career
On 24 September 1782 at Doncaster Racecourse, Imperatrix won the two-mile St. Leger Stakes, beating Monk (the evens favourite), Nobleman and two others. In her only other race she finished second to Miss Kitty in the Port Stakes at Pickering, beating the eight other runners.

Stud career
Imperatrix then became a broodmare and produced nine foals, including at least three winners. They were:

 Anvil filly – a bay filly foaled in 1790.
 Septem – a bay stallion sired by Saltram and foaled in 1792. Septem won several races including the King's Purse at Edinburgh.
 Lily – a bay mare sired by Highflyer and foaled in 1793. She won King's Purses at Newmarket and Haverford West. After retiring from racing she produced eight foals before her death in 1820, including Dimity and Bodkin, with the former producing foals herself.
 Imp – a bay filly sired by Weasel and foaled in 1795 who won races at Catterick Bridge and Blandford.
 Roarer – a bay colt by Coriander.
 Coriander filly – a bay filly foaled in 1797.
 Coriander colt – foaled in 1798.
 Coriander colt – a chestnut colt foaled in 1799.
 Sorcerer filly – a bay filly sired by Sorcerer and foaled in 1800.

There is no evidence that Imperatrix had any lasting influence on the Thoroughbred.

Pedigree

Note: b. = Bay, br. = Brown, ch. = Chestnut

* Imperatrix was inbred 3x4 to Cade, the Godolphin Arabian and the Cullen Arabian. This means that all three stallions appear once in the third generation and once in the fourth generation of her pedigree.

References

1779 racehorse births
Racehorses bred in the Kingdom of Great Britain
Racehorses trained in the Kingdom of Great Britain
Thoroughbred family 2-t
Godolphin Arabian sire line
St Leger winners